Gaspard Auguste Brullé (7 April, 1809 – 21 January, 1873) was a French entomologist.

Passionate about insects from a young age and through the intervention of Georges Cuvier, he participated in the Morea expedition organised by Jean Baptiste Bory de Saint-Vincent in 1829.

In 1832, he participated in the foundation of the Société entomologique de France. The following year he became an aide-naturaliste (assistant naturalist) to Jean Victoire Audouin in charge of Crustacea, Arachnida and insects.

Brullé studied for and obtained a baccalauréat in sciences then in "lettres", before qualifying in 1839 as a Doctor of Natural Science. His thesis, published in 1837, was Sur le gisement des insectes fossiles et sur les services que l'étude de ces animaux peut fournir à la géologie. He became the Professor of Zoology and Comparative Anatomy at the University of Dijon.

He proposed a new classification of Neuroptera which was completed by Wilhelm Ferdinand Erichson. He also wrote the introduction, parts of the text of Histoire naturelle des insectes coléoptères (published in 1840) with Francis de Laporte de Castelnau and parts of Histoire naturelle des insectes. Hyménoptères with Amédée Louis Michel le Peletier, comte de Saint-Fargeau.

Étienne Mulsant named the ladybird beetle species Scymnus brullei in his honor

See also
 European and American voyages of scientific exploration
:Category:Taxa named by Gaspard Auguste Brullé

References
 Gouillard J. (2004). Histoire des entomologistes français, 1750-1950. Édition entièrement revue et augmentée. Boubée (Paris), 287 pp.
 Jaussaud P. & Brygoo E.R. (2004). Du Jardin au Muséum en 516 biographies. Muséum national d’histoire naturelle de Paris, 630 pp. 
 Lhoste J. (1987). Les Entomologistes français. 1750-1950. INRA Éditions, 351 pp.
 Mulsant, M.E. (1850). Species des coléoptères trimères sécuripalpes. Ann. Sci. Phys. Nat. Lyon 2:984

1809 births
1873 deaths
French entomologists
University of Burgundy alumni